My Wife & I, is a 2017 Nigerian comedy family film directed by Bunmi Ajakaiye and co-produced by Moses Babatope, Kene Mkparu, Kene Okwuosa, Zulu Onuekwusi, Chinaza Onuzo and Isioma Osaje. The film stars Ramsey Nouah and Omoni Oboli with Dorcas Shola-Fapson, Bimbo Ademoye, and Lilian Afegbai in supporting roles. The film tells the story of Toyosi and Ebere, an unhappily married couple on the brink of a divorce, but later change their marital status further high.

The film premiered on 25 August 2017. On 23 December 2018, the film made its television premiere in Taiwan. The film received positive reviews from critics and screened worldwide.

Cast
 Ramsey Nouah as Toyosi Akinyele
 Omoni Oboli as Ebere Akinyele
 Dorcas Shola-Fapson as Jumoke Fashanu
 Bimbo Ademoye as Georgina
 Lilian Afegbai as Yetunde Akinyele
 Adeolu Adefarasin as Idris Joda
 Rotimi Adelegan as Kehinde Martins
 Alex Ayalogu as Chukwudi Okadigbo
 Jumoke George as Aunty Ayo
 Joshua Johnson as Timi Salako
 Ngozi Nwosu as Bisi Akinyele
 Sambasa Nzeribe as Emeka Okadigbo
 Rachel Oniga as Uchenna Okadigbo
 Nnadozie Onyiriuka as Okey Akinyele
 Jemima Osunde as Ireti Akinyele
 Seyilaw as Pastor Theophilus 
 Gloria Okafor as Dumebi 
 Oribhabor Dickson as Spa Attendant
 Emeka Duru as Shoprite Inspector
 Chinonso Ejiogwu as Gateman
 Mgbanwa Franklin as Farm Inspector
 Bolanle Ninalowo as Husband 
 Abimbola Craig as Wife
 Maryame Obiora as Debbie
 Praise Sam Ogan as Hot Waitress
 Wale Shabiolegbe as Aunty Ayo's Driver

References

External links 
 

English-language Nigerian films
2017 films
2017 comedy films
Nigerian comedy films
2010s English-language films